Gregory Lindquist (born 31 January 1954), more commonly known as Greg Lindquist, is a former Australian rules footballer who played for Geelong in the Victorian Football League (now known as the Australian Football League).

References

External links
 

1954 births
Living people
Geelong Football Club players
Australian rules footballers from Victoria (Australia)
People educated at Geelong College